A manta is a rectangular textile that was worn as a blanket or as a wrap-around dress. When worn as a dress, the manta is held together by a woven sash.

Mantas are worn by such indigenous peoples as the Navajo, Hopi, and Pueblo peoples. Today they are worn during important ceremonies, such as weddings, dances, and feast days

See also
Navajo weaving
Serape

Notes

Indigenous textile art of the Americas
Hopi culture
Navajo culture
Native American clothing
Pueblo culture
Dresses